Elena Andreevna Volkova (3 June 1915 – 8 October 2013)  (in ), was a Russian painter, born in Russian Empire Chuguyev.

Biography
Elena Volkova was born in 1915 in the Russian Empire, Kharkov Governorate, Chuguyev (birthplace of Ilya Repin) from a modest family, her father was a swimming coach and her mother, a peasant. 
In 1934 Volkova began to work as assistant-projectionist for a mobile cinema. During the war she was affected in an hospital; her husband died during the war. Without any artistic training, she began to paint at the beginning of the 1960s at the age of 45. She was quickly noticed by Vasyl Yermylov Kharkiv, founder of the Ukrainian avant-garde, who bought a number of her paintings. She was then noticed by Michael Alpatov, a famous Moscow art critic.

Sergei Tarabarov of the Gallery of Naive Art "Dar" (National Center for Contemporary Art of Moscow (NCCA)), said in 2000 that Elena Volkova was one of the most interesting naïve artist in Russia.  Volkova lived in Moscow.

Work
Her naïve painting represents all the natural, gorgeous and good things which make the happiness of simple people: animals, fruits, flowers, festive tables and nudes. Things round and full of life, as offerings to the ancient gods.

Exhibitions
 1973 Omsk, first solo exhibition
 1990 Permanent collection of Gallery of Naïve Art (National Center for Contemporary Art of Moscow (NCCA))
 2001 Moscow Museum of Modern Art, Exhibition " Peace to everybody! "
 2005 Tretyakov Gallery of Moscow, Retrospective

References

External links
 http://www.ng.ru/style/2000-07-22/16_naive.html
 http://www.all-art.org/art_20th_century/modern_art/Naive%20art1.htm
 http://www.all-art.org/art_20th_century/modern_art/Naive%20art2.htm
 https://www.webcitation.org/68Z40LNwL?url=http://new.kultura-portal.ru/tree_new/cultpaper/article.jsp?number=314&rubric_id=205&crubric_id=100421&pub_id=122266
 http://www.museum.ru/N24701

Naïve painters
1915 births
2013 deaths
20th-century Russian painters
21st-century Russian painters
20th-century Russian women artists
21st-century Russian women artists
Russian women painters
Soviet painters